Dennis Edwards Jr. (February 3, 1943 – February 1, 2018) was an American soul and R&B singer who was best known as the frontman in The Temptations, on Motown Records. Edwards joined the Temptations in 1968, replacing David Ruffin and sang with the group from 1968 to 1976, 1980 to 1984 and 1987 to 1989. In the mid-1980s, he attempted a solo career, scoring a hit in 1984 with "Don't Look Any Further" (featuring Siedah Garrett). Until his death, Edwards was the lead singer of The Temptations Review, a Temptations splinter group.

Biography

Early years and career
Edwards was born in Fairfield, Alabama, about eight miles from Birmingham, to Reverend Dennis Edwards Sr. He began singing as a toddler, just two years old, in his father's church. The Edwards family moved to Detroit, Michigan when Edwards was about ten years old, and Edwards would continue to sing in the church pastored by his father, eventually becoming choir director.

As a teenager, Edwards joined a gospel vocal group called The Mighty Clouds of Joy, and studied music at the Detroit Conservatory of Music. He was not allowed to sing or listen to secular music at home, and his mother disapproved when he began pursuing a career singing rhythm and blues music. In 1961 he organized his own soul/jazz group, Dennis Edwards and the Fireballs. In 1961, Edwards recorded a single for the obscure Detroit label, International Soulville Records, "I Didn't Have to (But I Did)" b/w "Johnnie on the Spot".

Edwards served as a field artilleryman in the U.S. Army from January 1961 to December 1963, spending most of his enlistment stationed in Europe. His last major duty assignment was with Headquarters Battery, 2nd Howitzer Battalion, 35th Artillery, Seventh Army. In 1966, Edwards auditioned for Detroit's Motown Records, where he was signed but placed on retainer. Later that year, he was assigned to join The Contours after their lead singer, Billy Gordon, fell ill. In 1967, the Contours were the opening act for several Temptations concerts, and Temptations members Eddie Kendricks and Otis Williams – who were considering replacing their own lead singer, David Ruffin (who was a personal friend of Edwards), took notice of Edwards and made his acquaintance.

1967–1984: The Temptations years
Later in 1967, Edwards quit the Contours and was placed back on retainer. He attempted to get a release from his contract, as Holland–Dozier–Holland had promised to sign him to their new Invictus Records, but was drafted in late June 1968 to join the Temptations, who had just fired Ruffin from the act. Ruffin had tipped Edwards off that he was being drafted as his replacement, which eased Edwards's conscience in replacing him.

The Temptations officially introduced Edwards on July 9, 1968 on stage in Valley Forge, Pennsylvania. However, Ruffin, who was attempting to make his way back into the group, crashed the stage during Edwards's lead vocal on "Ain't Too Proud to Beg" to significant applause. He continued similar stunts for about a month until, according to Edwards, the group decided to lay-off Edwards — with the promise of a solo deal from Motown — and rehire Ruffin. When Ruffin failed to show for his return engagement in Gaithersburg, Maryland the next night, Edwards was permanently kept on and the Temptations refused to entertain rehiring Ruffin any further. Edwards was the first singer to join the Temptations after their "Classic 5" period. With his rougher gospel-hewn vocals, Edwards led the group through its psychedelic, funk, and disco periods, singing on hits such as "Cloud Nine" (1968), "I Can't Get Next to You" (1969), "Ball of Confusion (That's What the World Is Today)" (1970), "Papa Was a Rollin' Stone" (1972), and "Shakey Ground" (1975), among others. Two of these songs, "Cloud Nine" and "Papa Was a Rollin' Stone", won Grammy Awards. During this time, Edwards was engaged to Yvonne "Frankie" Gearing, the lead singer of Quiet Elegance, who toured with The Temptations as their backing group.

Edwards remained in the Temptations until being fired by Otis Williams in 1977 just before the group's departure from Motown to Atlantic Records. After a failed attempt at a Motown solo career, Edwards rejoined the Temptations in 1980, when they returned to Motown. In 1982, Edwards got the chance to sing with Ruffin and Eddie Kendricks as part of the Reunion album and tour. Edwards began missing shows and rehearsals, and was replaced in 1984 by Ali-Ollie Woodson. In 1989, Edwards was inducted into the Rock and Roll Hall of Fame as a member of The Temptations. Edwards was also inducted into Rhythm & Blues Hall of Fame with The Temptations in 2013.

1984–1990: Solo career

Motown re-launched Edwards's solo career, in 1984 with the hit single "Don't Look Any Further", a duet with Siedah Garrett. The album of the same name reached No. 2 on the R&B charts and included the radio singles "(You're My) Aphrodisiac" and "Just Like You". When problems arose between Woodson and the Temptations in 1987, Edwards was brought back once again.

He and the group recorded the album entitled Together Again, featuring the hit single "I Wonder Who She's Seeing Now".

Edwards was again replaced by Woodson in 1989 after leaving the group for a third and final time.

1990–1994: Ruffin, Kendricks, and Edwards
Edwards toured and recorded with fellow ex-Temptation David Ruffin during the late 1980s as "Ruffin/Kendricks/Edwards, former leads of The Temptations", although nothing was released. The 1998 Street Gold DVD Original Leads of the Temptations documents this historic period. After the deaths of Ruffin and Kendricks, Edwards was forced to wrap up the project alone. In 1990, Dennis teamed up with Kendricks to release a dance/club track for A&B Records entitled "Get It While It's Hot". The track was recorded at Fredrick Knight's recording studio in the duo's old home town of Birmingham, Alabama; it was produced and engineered by house music pioneer Alan Steward. The track created a lot of controversy, as it contained a short rap sequence which did not sit very well with die-hard Temptations fans. Edwards's Don't Look Any Further: the Remix Album was released in 1998, containing updated dance mixes and the original 1984 track.

The Temptations Review featuring Dennis Edwards
During the 1990s, Edwards began touring under the name "Dennis Edwards & the Temptations", prompting a legal battle between himself and Otis Williams. In January 1999, it was ruled that Edwards was legally barred from using the band's name, which led Edwards's group to be called The Temptations Review featuring Dennis Edwards. Edwards's group included Paul Williams Jr. (son of original Temptations member Paul Williams), David Sea, Mike Patillo, and Chris Arnold. Edwards was portrayed by Charles Ley in the 1998 biographical television mini-series The Temptations, though he was not heavily focused upon, as the mini-series gave more attention to the Ruffin/Kendricks-era Temptations lineup. The Temptations Review group was inducted into the Rhythm and Blues Music Hall of Fame on October 4, 2015 in Detroit, Michigan, when Edwards was also given the Living Legend Award. His group continues to perform today as Dennis Edwards' Temptations Revue.

Personal life and death
Edwards had a relationship with singer Aretha Franklin, who stated he was the inspiration behind her 1972 soul song "Day Dreaming". Edwards was briefly married to Ruth Pointer, whom he wed in Las Vegas in 1977. The couple had one daughter, Issa Pointer, who became a member of her mother's vocal group, The Pointer Sisters. Edwards moved to Florissant, Missouri in the 1980s to be closer to his mother.

Edwards died in an Illinois hospital on February 1, 2018, at the age of 74, two days before his 75th birthday. He had been battling meningitis before his death.

Discography

Albums

Singles

References

Bibliography
 

1943 births
2018 deaths
African-American male singers
American disco singers
American funk singers
American male pop singers
American rhythm and blues singers
American soul musicians
American soul singers
Deaths from meningitis
Infectious disease deaths in Illinois
Motown artists
Musicians from Birmingham, Alabama
Musicians from Detroit
Neurological disease deaths in Illinois
People from Detroit
People from Fairfield, Alabama
People from St. Louis County, Missouri
The Contours members
The Temptations members
United States Army personnel